Vihanti railway station is located in the town of Vihanti, Northern Ostrobothnia, Finland.

Railway stations in North Ostrobothnia
Railway stations opened in 1886